St Giles' Church is a Church of Scotland church situated in the centre of Elgin, Moray, in north-east Scotland. It is Elgin's original parish church. 

The current building was built between 1825 and 1828 and designed in a Greek Revival style by architect Archibald Simpson. It has been a Category A listed building since 1971.

The first record of a church on the site is a charter from William the Lion, dating from between 1187 and 1189, granting St Giles' to the Bishop of Moray, though the discovery of the 9th century Elgin Pillar in the area of the churchyard in 1823 suggests that the medieval church may have had a much earlier predecessor.  St Giles' was restored after being burned by Alexander Stewart, the "Wolf of Badenoch", in 1390, and the nave was rebuilt after its vaulted stone roof collapsed in 1679. Burials in the churchyard ceased in the early 17th century, and cartloads of human bones were removed in 1826, either transferred to the graveyard of Elgin Cathedral or mixed with soil and spread on fields around the burgh, while gravestones were used to pave the High Street.

References

Bibliography

External links 
  Official website

Protestant churches converted from Roman Catholicism
Rebuilt churches in the United Kingdom
Churches completed in 1828
19th-century church buildings in Scotland
Church of Scotland churches in Scotland
Category A listed buildings in Moray
Listed churches in Scotland
Churches in Moray